SS Louis Sheid was a 6,057 ton Belgian steamer that ran aground off Devon after escaping  following the rescue of the captain and crew of the freighter  on 7 December 1939.

She was built by Nord Werft of Bremerhaven under the name Ultor and renamed Kendal Castle prior to being badged Louis Sheid for the Belgian National Shipping Line. 
  

Two Thirds Blue Sub-Aqua Club (SAA 912) adopted the wreck under the scheme run by the Nautical Archaeology Society.

References 

World War II shipwrecks in the English Channel
Wreck diving sites in the United Kingdom
Maritime incidents in December 1939
1920 ships